Horse Play is a 1933 American pre-Code comedy film directed by Edward Sedgwick and written by H. M. Walker and Dale Van Every. The film stars Slim Summerville, Andy Devine, Leila Hyams, May Beatty, Una O'Connor and David Torrence. The film was released on June 1, 1933, by Universal Pictures.

Cast 
Slim Summerville as Slim Perkins
Andy Devine as Andy
Leila Hyams as Angelica Wayne
May Beatty as The Duchess
Una O'Connor as Clementia
David Torrence as Uncle Percy
Cornelius Keefe as Philip Marley
Ferdinand Gottschalk as Oswald
Ethel Griffies as Emily
Lucille Lund as Iris

References

External links 
 

1933 films
1930s English-language films
American comedy films
1933 comedy films
Universal Pictures films
Films directed by Edward Sedgwick
American black-and-white films
1930s American films